Alopecurus creticus, the Cretan meadow foxtail, is a species of foxtail grass.

It is a bunchgrass native to Bulgaria, Serbia, North Macedonia, Greece, the east Aegean Islands, Crete and Turkey. It can be found in marshes and wet places near sea level, and wet grasslands near freshwater sub-saline grassy flats.

It is threatened by coastal development and marsh draining.

References

creticus
Bunchgrasses of Europe
Flora of Southeastern Europe
Flora of Crete
Flora of Malta